Tac-tac is a 1982 Mexican film. It was directed by Luis Alcoriza.

External links
 

1982 films
Mexican drama films
1980s Spanish-language films
Films directed by Luis Alcoriza
1980s Mexican films